Walckenaeria directa is a species of dwarf spider in the family Linyphiidae. It is found in the US and Canada.

References

Further reading

 
 
 
 
 
 
 
 
 

Linyphiidae
Spiders described in 1874